The 1925 Wyoming Cowboys football team was an American football team that represented the University of Wyoming as a member of the Rocky Mountain Conference (RMC) during the 1925 college football season. In their second season under head coach William Henry Dietz, the Cowboys compiled a 6–3 record (4–3 against conference opponents), finished fifth in the RMC, and outscored opponents by a total of 147 to 83. They won their first five games and then lost three of the last four games, including rivalry games with Utah Agricultural and Colorado Agricultural.

The 1925 team had the only winning record in Wyoming program history between 1911 and 1931.

Schedule

References

Wyoming
Wyoming Cowboys football seasons
Wyoming Cowboys football